By-wire refers to technologies in which something is controlled electronically or electro-mechanically, rather than mechanically, as well as analogously to some other electronics-driven technologies. Instances include:
 Drive by wire, in automotive contexts
 Brake-by-wire, concerning brakes
 Park by wire, concerning engagement of the parking pawl
 Shift-by-wire, concerning automatic transmissions
 Fly-by-wire, in aviation contexts
 Power-by-wire, concerning the powering of aircraft's flight control
 Managing by wire, management relying on computer-generated information